Phoenix most often refers to:

 Phoenix (mythology), a legendary bird from ancient Greek folklore
 Phoenix, Arizona, a city in the United States

Phoenix may also refer to:

Mythology

Greek mythological figures 
 Phoenix (son of Amyntor), a Trojan War hero in Greek mythology
 Phoenix (son of Agenor), a Greek mythological figure
 Phoenix, a chieftain who came as Guardian of the young Hymenaeus when they joined Dionysus in his campaign against India (see Phoenix (Greek myth))

Mythical birds called phoenix 
 Phoenix (mythology), a mythical bird from Egyptian, Greek and Roman legends
 Egyptian Bennu
 Hindu Garuda and Gandabherunda
 Firebird (Slavic folklore), in Polish Żar-ptak, Russian Zharptitsa, Serbian Žar ptica, and Slovak Vták Ohnivák
 Tűzmadár, in Hungarian mythology
 Persian Simurgh, in Arabian Anka, Turkish Zümrüdü Anka, and Georgian Paskunji
 Chinese Fenghuang, in Japanese Hō-ō, Tibetan Me Byi Karmo, Korean Bonghwang, and Vietnamese Phượng (hoàng) or Phụng (hoàng)
 East Asian Vermilion Bird in Chinese Zhū Què, Japanese Suzaku, Korean Jujak or Bulsajo, and Vietnamese Chu Tước
 Chol (bible), Milcham, Avarshina, Urshinah or other transliterations of 
 Nine-headed Bird, one of the earliest forms of the Chinese phoenix (Fenghuang)

Places

Canada
 Phoenix, Alberta
 Phoenix, British Columbia

United States
 Phoenix, Arizona
 Phoenix metropolitan area, Arizona
 Phoenix, Georgia
 Phoenix, Illinois
 Phoenix, Louisiana
 Phoenix, Maryland
 Phoenix, Michigan
 Phoenix, Mississippi
 Phoenix, Edison, New Jersey
 Phoenix, Sayreville, New Jersey
 Phoenix, New York
 Phoenix, Oregon

Elsewhere
 Phoenix (Caria), a town of ancient Caria, now in Turkey
 Phoenix (Crete), a town of ancient Crete mentioned in the Bible
 Phoenix (Lycia), a town of ancient Lycia, now in Turkey
 Phoenix Park, Dublin, Ireland
 Phoenix Islands, in the Republic of Kiribati
 Phoenix, KwaZulu-Natal, in South Africa
 Phoenix City, a nickname for Warsaw, the capital of Poland
 Phoenix, a river of Thessaly, Greece, that flowed at the ancient city of Anthela

Arts and entertainment

Comics
 Phoenix (manga) (Hi no Tori), by Osamu Tezuka
 The Phoenix (comics), a weekly British comics anthology

Fictional entities

Characters 
 Phoenix (comics), alias used by several comics characters
 Phoenix Force (comics), a Marvel Comics entity
 Jean Grey, also known as Phoenix and Dark Phoenix, an X-Men character
 Rachel Summers, a Marvel Comics character also known as Phoenix
 Phoenix (Transformers)
 Phoenix Raynor, a Shortland Street character
 Phoenix Wright, an Ace Attorney character
 Aster Phoenix (or Edo Phoenix), a Yu-Gi-Oh! GX character
 Paul Phoenix (Tekken), a Tekken character
 Simon Phoenix, a Demolition Man character
 Stefano DiMera, also known as The Phoenix, a Days of our Lives character
 Phoenix, female protagonist of the film Phantom of the Paradise, played by Jessica Harper
 Phoenix Jackson, female protagonist of "A Worn Path" by Eudora Welty

Organizations
 Phoenix Foundation (MacGyver)
 Phoenix Organization, an organization in John Doe
 Order of the Phoenix (fictional organisation), a secret society in Harry Potter

Vessels
 Phoenix (Star Trek), a spacecraft

Film 
 Fushichō (English: Phoenix), a 1947 film by Keisuke Kinoshita
 The Phoenix (1959 film), by Robert Aldrich
 Phoenix (1998 film), a crime film by Danny Cannon
 Phoenix (2006 film), a gay-related film by Michael Akers
 Phoenix (2014 film), a film by Christian Petzold

Literature

Books
 Phoenix: The Posthumous Papers of D. H. Lawrence (1885–1930), an anthology of work by D. H. Lawrence
 Phoenix (novel), by Stephen Brust
 The Phoenix (novel), by Henning Boëtius
 Phoenix IV: The History of the Videogame Industry, by Leonard Herman

Periodicals
List of periodicals named Phoenix
The Phoenix (magazine), Ireland
The Phoenix (newspaper), United States'
 Project Phoenix, codename of the aborted BBC Newsbrief magazine

Other literature
 The Phoenix (play), by Thomas Middleton
 The Phoenix (Old English poem)
 The Phoenix, a play by Morgan Spurlock
 The Phoenix, a poem attributed to Lactantius

Music

Musicians 
 Phoenix (band), a French alternative rock band
 Transsylvania Phoenix, also known as Phoenix, a Romanian rock band
 Dave Farrell, American bass guitarist in the band Linkin Park

Albums
 Phoenix (Agathodaimon album)
 Phoenix (Asia album)
 Phoenix (Vince Bell album)
 Phoenix, a 2003 EP by Breaking Pangaea
 Phoenix (Charlotte Cardin album)
 Phoenix (Carpark North album)
 The Phoenix (CKY album)
 Phoenix (Clan of Xymox album)
 Phoenix (Classic Crime album)
 Phoenix (Dreamtale album)
 Phoenix (Emil Bulls album)
 Phoenix (Everything in Slow Motion album)
 The Phoenix (EP), an EP by Flipsyde
 Phoenix (Dan Fogelberg album)
 Phoenix (Grand Funk Railroad album)
 Phoenix: The Very Best of InMe, a 2010 greatest hits collection
 The Phoenix (Lyfe Jennings album)
 Phoenix (Just Surrender album)
 Phoenix (Labelle album)
 The Phoenix (Mastercastle album)
 Phoenix (Nocturnal Rites album)
 Phoenix (Rita Ora album)
 Phoenix, album by Pink Turns Blue
 The Phoenix (Raghav album)
 Phoenix (Warlocks album)
 Phoenix (EP), by the Warlocks
 Phoenix (Zebrahead album)

Songs 
 List of songs named for the phoenix

Television 
 The Phoenix (1982 TV series), an American science fiction series
 Phoenix (Australian TV series), an Australian police drama
 Phoenix (South Korean TV series), a 2004 Korean drama
 "Phoenix", the 1986 premiere episode of The Adventures of the Galaxy Rangers
 "The Phoenix", a 1995 episode of Lois & Clark: The New Adventures of Superman
 "Phoenix", a 2003 episode of Smallville
 "Phoenix" (Breaking Bad), a 2009 episode of Breaking Bad
 "Phoenix" (NCIS), a 2012 episode of NCIS

Video gaming 
 Phoenix Engine (disambiguation)
 Phoenix (video game)
 Phoenix1, a League of Legends team

Other uses in arts and entertainment

 Atlanta from the Ashes (The Phoenix), an Atlanta, Georgia, monument
 Phoenix Art Museum, the Southwest United States' largest art museum for visual art
 Phoenix (chess), a fairy chess piece
 Phoenix (roller coaster)
 Phoenix, a Looping Starship ride at Busch Gardens Tampa Bay

Business

In business, generally:
 Phoenix company, a commercial entity which has emerged from the collapse of another through insolvency

Specific businesses named "Phoenix" include:

Airlines
 Phoenix Air, an airline operating from Georgia, United States
 Phoenix Aviation, a UAE-Kyrgyzstan airline

Finance companies
 The Phoenix Companies, a Hartford-based financial services company
 Phoenix Finance, a financial company which attempted to enter into Formula One racing
 Phoenix Fire Office, a former British insurance company

Media companies
 Phoenix (German TV station)
 Phoenix (St. Paul's Churchyard), a historical bookseller in London
 Phoenix Books, a publisher
 Phoenix Games, an American game company that produced role-playing games and game supplements
 Phoenix Television, a Hong Kong broadcaster

Theatres 
 Phoenix Theatre (disambiguation)
 Phoenix Theatre, London, a West End theatre
 Phoenix Concert Theatre, a concert venue and nightclub in Toronto, Ontario, Canada
 La Fenice (The Phoenix), an opera house in Venice, Italy

Manufacturers

Vehicle manufacturers 
 Phoenix (bicycles), a Chinese company
 Phoenix (British automobile company), an early 1900s company
 Phoenix Industries, an American aircraft manufacturer
 Phoenix Motorcars, a manufacturer of electric vehicles
 Phoenix Venture Holdings, owner of the MG Rover Group

Other manufacturers 
 Phoenix (nuclear technology company), specializing in neutron generator technology
 Phoenix AG, a German rubber products company
 Phoenix Beverages, a brewery in Mauritius
 Phoenix Contact, a manufacturer of industrial automation, interconnection, and interface solutions
 Phoenix Iron Works (Phoenixville, Pennsylvania), owner of the Phoenix Bridge Company
 Phoenix Petroleum Philippines, Inc., a Philippine oil and gas company

Military 
 AIM-54 Phoenix, a missile
 BAE Systems Phoenix, an unmanned air vehicle
 HMHT-302 ("Phoenix"), a U.S. Marine Corps helicopter squadron
 Phoenix breakwaters, a set of World War II caissons
 Phoenix Program, a Vietnam War military operation
 Project Phoenix (South Africa), a National Defence Force program

People
 Phoenix (given name)
 Phoenix (surname),  multiple people
 Phoenix Copley (born 1992), American ice hockey goaltender
 Phoenix Sinclair (2000–2005), Canadian murder victim
 Dave Farrell (born 1977), American bass guitarist in the band Linkin Park
 Nahshon Even-Chaim (born 1971), or "Phoenix", convicted Australian computer hacker
 Jody Fleisch (born 1980), professional wrestler nicknamed "The Phoenix"

Schools
 University of Phoenix, United States
 Phoenix Academy (disambiguation), including several private schools
 Phoenix High School (disambiguation)

Science and technology

Astronomy 
 Phoenix Cluster, a galaxy cluster
 Phoenix (Chinese astronomy)
 Phoenix (constellation)
 Phoenix stream, a stream of very old stars found in the constellation
 Phoenix Dwarf, a galaxy
 Project Phoenix (SETI), a search for extraterrestrial intelligence

Biology 
 Phoenix (chicken)
 Phoenix (grape)
 Phoenix (moth)
 Phoenix (plant), a genus of palms

Computing 
 Phoenix (computer), an IBM mainframe at the University of Cambridge
 Phoenix (tkWWW-based browser), a web browser and HTML editor discontinued in 1995
 Phoenix (web framework), a web development framework
 Phoenix Network Coordinates, used to compute network latency
 Phoenix Object Basic, a RAD tool
 Phoenix Technologies, a BIOS manufacturer
 Apache Phoenix, a relational database engine
 Microsoft Phoenix, a compiler framework
 Mozilla Phoenix, the original name for the Firefox web browser
 Phoenix pay system, a payroll processing system

Vehicles

 Phoenix (spacecraft), a NASA mission to Mars
 AIM-54 Phoenix, a missile
 BAE Systems Phoenix, an unmanned air vehicle
 EADS Phoenix, a prototype launch vehicle
 Bristol Phoenix, an aircraft engine
 Chrysler Phoenix engine, an automotive engine series
 Dodge Dart Phoenix, an American car produced 1960–1961
 Dodge Phoenix, Australian car produced 1960–1973
 Pontiac Phoenix, an American car produced 1977–1984
 Phoenix Air Phoenix, a Czech glider

Other technologies
 Phoenix (ATC), an air traffic control system
 Fénix capsules, rescue equipment used after the 2010 Copiapó mining accident

Ships
 , several Royal Navy ships
 , several ships that sailed for the British East India Company between 1680 and 1821
 , several U.S. Navy ships
 Phoenix, involved in the 1688 Siege of Derry
 , involved in the sea otter trade
 , the first ship built in Russian America
 , made one voyage in 1824 carrying convicts to Tasmania; grounded, condemned, and turned into a prison hulk; broken up in 1837
 , a steamboat built 1806–1807
 , built in France in 1809; captured by the British Royal Navy in 1810; employed as a whaling ship from 1811 to 1829
 , a merchant vessel launched in 1810; made one voyage to India for the British East India Company; made three voyages transporting convicts to Australia; wrecked in 1829
 , a steamboat that burned on Lake Champlain in 1819; its wreck is a Vermont state historic site
 , a Nantucket whaling vessel in operation 1821–1858
 , a steamship that burned on Lake Michigan in 1847 with the loss of at least 190 lives
 , a U.S. Coast Survey ship in service from 1845 to 1858
 , a German cargo ship which later saw service as the vorpostenboot V-106 Phönix
 , a Danish ship built in 1929
 , which went by the name Phoenix from 1946 to 1948
 , a 1955 fireboat operating in San Francisco, California
 , a rescue vessel used to save migrants, refugees and other people in distress in the Mediterranean Sea

Sports 
 List of sports teams named for the phoenix
 Phoenix club (sports), a team that closes and is rebuilt under a new structure and often a new name
 Phoenix Finance, a Formula One entrant
 Phoenix Hagen, a German basketball club
 Phoenix Raceway, Avondale, Arizona
 Phoenix, an annual sports festival at the National Institute of Technology Karnataka

Other uses 
 Phoenix (currency), the first currency of modern Greece
 Phoenix LRT station, Singapore
 Phoenix codes, radio shorthand used by British police
 The Phoenix Patrol Challenge, a Scoutcraft competition
 Phoenix Pay System, a Canadian federal employee payroll system
 The Phoenix – S K Club, a social club at Harvard College

See also 

 Fengcheng (disambiguation), various Chinese locations whose names mean "Phoenix" or "Phoenix City"

 
 De Phoenix (disambiguation)
 Feniks (disambiguation)
 Fenix (disambiguation)
 Phenex, in demonology, a Great Marquis of Hell
 Phenix (disambiguation)
 Phoenicus (disambiguation)
 Phoenicia (disambiguation)
 Phoenician (disambiguation)
 Firebird (disambiguation)
 Redbird (disambiguation)